Sebastian Vasiliadis (born 4 October 1997) is a German professional footballer who plays as a midfielder for 2. Bundesliga club Arminia Bielefeld.

Club career

SC Paderborn
On 1 July 2018, Vasiliadis signed a two years' contract with 2. Bundesliga club SC Paderborn for an undisclosed fee. On 25 November 2018, he scored a brace in a 5–1 away win against 1. FC Heidenheim in the last ten minutes of the match.. In the 2018–19 season, in a remarkable turn of events, Vasiliadis (6 goals, 8 assists) helped the newly promoted side club managed another top-two finish, which returned Paderborn to the Bundesliga after years of turbulence. He started the 2019–20 season as the undisputed leader in the middle line.

On 2 February 2020, Vasiliadis scored his first goal in the season in a 2–4 home loss against VfL Wolfsburg with a right footed shot from outside the box to the centre of the goal, after an assist from Abdelhamid Sabiri.

Arminia Bielefeld
In January 2021, it was reported that Vasiliadis would join Arminia Bielefeld from SC Paderborn in the summer, at which point he was out of contract. Bielefeld had first shown interest in Vasiliadis the previous summer, but the two clubs could not agree on a transfer fee at the time. The move was confirmed in May. Vasiliadis signed a three-year contract. On 30 October 2021, he made his debut with the club as a late substitute in a 2–1 home loss against Mainz 05. In December 2021, Vasiliadis contracted COVID-19 forcing him to isolate at home.

International career
Born in Germany, Vasiliadis comes from a Greek family and is eligible to represent both Germany and Greece internationally.

On 11 November 2019, Vasiliadis was called by Greece national team coach John van 't Schip ahead for the upcoming UEFA Euro 2020 qualifying fixtures against Armenia and Finland, on 15 and 18 November 2019 respectively, but did not feature in either match.

Personal life
Vasiliadis was born in Auenwald, Germany, to Greek father and German mother.

Career statistics

References

1997 births
Living people
Association football midfielders
German footballers
German people of Greek descent
Bundesliga players
2. Bundesliga players
3. Liga players
Oberliga (football) players
VfR Aalen players
SC Paderborn 07 players
Arminia Bielefeld players